Frédéric Fiebig (1885–1953) was a Latvian-born painter who lived in France. He was influenced by both post-Impressionism and Cubism and is considered a member of the Expressionist movement. Fiebig was a great traveler, passionate about urban landscape and nature, where he drew his inspiration, until a series of family dramas forced him to settle in Alsace (East of France).

Biography

Early years in Courland and Imperial Russia 
Frédéric Fiebig was born in a family of Baltic German father and Latvian mother (born Laiveniece) - both lived in Talsi near Riga and were citizens of the Courland Governorate, now Latvia (then administered by the Russian Empire since the Treaty of Nystad). His father was a carpenter and his mother a seamstress. His native small town situated near the Baltic Sea, is nicknamed "the Pearl of Kurzeme" or "the city with nine hills and two lakes". The city hosted an important Jewish community, and he met Elisabet Auguste Krause, who became his teacher. He attended the Alexander High School in Riga in 1905. Elisabet, who is her twenty-year-old eldest, likes the painting of the young man and his talent. She supported him financially and encouraged him to continue his studies at the Imperial Academy of Arts of St Petersburg to improve his artistic skills. Saint Petersburg in Russia is the nearest prominent art center. The young painter travels through the seven hundred kilometers which separate him from this city and settles there  to study under the guidance of Prof. Dmitry Nicolajevich Kardovsky, who was also an active Russian painter and art dealer. The rather repetitive painting work entrusted to him in Kardovsky workshop, where the orders were mainly directed towards classical painting, especially portraits, was of little interest to him after some time. He secretly married Elisabet in 1906. Fiebig sought a more personal style and was already attracted by a less figurative and much more experimental form of art. Several of his works of this period, including realistic representations of the main street of Talsi are exhibited in the city's museum. Fiebig's style at that time is simple, figurative and precise, but he will profoundly distance himself from it after leaving Saint Petersburg.

A new artistic life in Paris

Finding his own style in Paris 
Unsatisfied with the classical teachings of Saint Petersburg, he decided to leave for Paris, the arts capital of the time. After a brief stay in his hometown, he traveled with Elisabet two thousand three hundred kilometers to settle there. He is accepted at the prestigious Académie Julian, from September 1907 to March 1908. He was a student of portraitist and landscape painter Henri Royer and of portraitist Marcel-André Baschet. He discovers the painters of Barbizon and Claude Monet. Success comes very early. His style, specific to this period, is made of large and sensual touches with a fluid contour. His work is parallel to that of Georges Rouault. Just like Albert Marquet, his contemporary painter, Fiebig drew from the same sources of inspiration: Paris and the banks of the river Seine then Italy. The parallel between the two men is quite striking, moreover, they are both great travelers sharing many subjects of common inspiration, a quiet personality and a desire to stay aside from mundanities. In 1911–1912, Fiebig brightened his palette under the sun of southern Europe by traveling on foot from Lugano (Switzerland) to Naples (South of Italy). His views of the Italian cities will be greeted by the French poet, Guillaume Apollinaire. He will also paint, in the wake of the Fauves, luminous landscapes and numerous olive trees. He is fascinated by the extraordinary light that modulates colors and shapes at different times of the day.

In 1912, the Bernheim-Jeune art gallery staged for him a first personal exhibition and encouraged him, but with a mild warning: "You are ten years ahead of your time." This rather silent artist does not lack humor and fantasy as shown by his engraved woods which appeared in 1912 in the 55th issue of the magazine "Les Tendances Nouvelles" (The new trends), which is promoted by the "International Union of Fine Arts, Literature, Sciences and Industry", a French artists' association founded by Alexis Mérodack-Jeanneau. The magazine's honor committee is very visible and includes a number of prestigious artists such as D'Annunzio, Degas, Dierx, D'Indy, Huysmans, Geffroy, Monet, Rodin. Fiebig likes tales and epic novels such as Don Quixote for which he will make a series of woodprints. The fame of the painter does not have time to spread on the art market, the First World War is already hitting Europe. As a native of Courland, a province now under German administration since the creation of the Ober Ost in 1915, Fiebig is considered a German citizen. He does not feel safe in Paris and quickly decides to leave the French capital city and takes refuge in the Landes (South West of France near the Atlantic coast).

The beginning of celebrity after WW1 
After the armistice, he returned to Paris where he began to pursue his artistic career. His silent and sometime difficult personality does not facilitate the relationships with the world of art and the art galleries for which mundanities and relationships are important. However, he participated in various art fairs. His style continues to change, he uses the knife more often than the brush. His palette is rich and colorful. His canvas is filed with polygons, mostly tapered triangles that remind of Cézanne and Cubism. Once again, the success is coming and the art critics are very positive on his work. The young artist regularly exhibits his paintings at the "Salon d'Automne" and at the "Indépendants" in Paris, then in Barcelona, London and New York. From 1921, he also contributed to collective exhibitions of Russian artists in Harbin, Shanghai, Moscow, Vladivostok and in 1913-14 he participated in the third Latvian art exhibition in Riga.

His wife Elisabet continued to support financially the whole family at times when Fiebig struggled to make a living, including the two children, Raya (1919-2007) and Eric (1921-1932), whom Fiebig had of his liaison with Debora Logak a Jewish Ukrainian student of twenty-two years old. Elisabet welcomed not only her husband's children as her own but also Debora who had been rejected by her own family. Debora separated from the painter after the birth of Eric. Fiebieg was haunted by the genetic disease that undermined his son's health. The Fiebig family left Paris and settled in Ladevèze and Lescar (near the Pyrénées, in France), after the doctors recommended an extended stay in the mountain fresh air for the young boy. Two years later, the family returned to Paris, and the painter found his inspiration on the banks of the river Seine and in the streets of the city. He strolled in the street of Paris in search of inspiration. He liked to paint on small canvases and also liked the larger formats but never fell into excessive dimensions. He painted Paris precisely, in often vibrant and delicate tones, the Luxembourg garden, the zinc roofs, the piles of sand that line the river Seine for the barges and many other subjects that make him a Parisian painter. However, he always felt not so welcome and misunderstood in Paris.

Tough times and oblivion in Alsace

Moving to Alsace and retiring in Tännchel 
His painting was gradually enriched with new concepts that brought him closer to expressionism and the conciseness of abstract art. He extracted his subjects from his immediate environment and fixed them on canvas under unusual angles. He had a keen sense of geometric simplification of forms and his search for delivering a surprising perspective was never trivial. He remained himself and shared his emotions with this unusual look on the urban landscape that surrounds him. The result was well controlled oscillation between figurative and abstract art. He continued to draw his inspiration from the countryside and remained close to nature. After brief journeys in the south-west, he finally settled in 1929, in Alsace in the small city of Sélestat with his wife Elisabet, his daughter Raya and his son Eric. The fresh air of the Vosges mountains seemed better for the health of his son. Fiebig worked on themes between the city landscape and nature.

In 1932, Eric died of his long illness at the age of 11 years. This first family drama broke the painter and he decided to settle permanently in Sélestat where a street now bears his name. In 1934, he remained so depressed that he retired to the Tännchel mountains where he lived as a hermit in the Grimmelshütte, a poor forest shelter. This place known for ancient megalithic cults seemed to have encouraged him to move forward. He kept close to nature, which he observed and painted on countless small "in carto" formats to find peace, he "eats nettles and drinks rainwater". He stayed there all winter, which was particularly harsh and became known as the ghost of Tännchel, but some villagers still brought him supplies from time to time. "Hearing beating the heart of the earth, feeling your blood circulating and translating these feelings at least roughly into my painting, that's what I call living," he said. In town, people were gossiping on this secluded painter, the hikers or the woodcutters whom he came across from time to time in the mountain believed that he was a madman. On 8 December 1934, the newspaper of Sélestat published a long article on the ghost of the Tännchel in which Fiebig was presented as a "very bearded and very hairy" person who had a rat as his sole companion. Not everyone appreciated the painter's presence in the shelter. In 1935, the Gendarmerie came and found him: he was obliged to go down to the valley in Sélestat. "If his stay had lasted more than a year, he could have pretended to become the tenant of the refuge." Being a bit more serene, he agreed to submit to the important regional exhibition of the "Artists and Friends of the Arts of Colmar" in 1936. It was a success as his work was welcome again and he delivered nearly 100 paintings that year. He painted close to 600 canvas in Alsace, essentially small sizes representing the surrounding landscape in all seasons. Unfortunately, the annexation of Alsace by Nazi Germany and the financial crisis vaporized his savings and made him very poor again.

Family tragedies and the upcoming WW2 
In addition, several tragedies continued to strike him. In 1942 his wife Elisabet died and in 1943 his daughter Raya, born of a Jewish mother, was deported to the Gaggenau internment camp by the Nazis who occupied Alsace. Debora Logak, the mother of her children living in Montrouge near Paris, was arrested in July 1942 in the sinister French police raid of the Vélodrome d'Hiver. She was held at Drancy internment camp and was believed to have been summarily killed at the Auschwitz internment camp. Having heard that the Third Reich supported artists, Fiebig sent a pension request to Goebbels who could not care less about the painter's works. Although German by birth, he was not well accepted by the Nazi administration, especially as a native of Courland. He was almost forced to display his work during the military occupation of France by Germany in exchange for vague promises of pension that would never materialise. His daughter Raya was miraculously spared after a short Nazi arrest. In spite of multiple requests, the French citizenship would never be granted to him. Hurt by a difficult life during both world wars and personal dramas, he became almost blind from 1946 and could no longer paint or work. After the war, he was sent in 1948 to the Schweisguth barracks in Sélestat set up by the Social Welfare for the needy. Fiebig would remain nostalgic for the landscapes of Courland all his life. He died in poverty in Sélestat on 6 February 1953, leaving behind Raya and a significant but unrecognized art work. His relatives reported that he had been buried in the Protestant cemetery, but the town of Sélestat, whose street is named after him, has no record of his grave in his registers.

His workshop is then stored in boxes and almost forgotten in an attic. Fiebig's work will resurface again thanks to the persistence of his daughter Raya who will make his work better known from 1975. Joseph Logel a notability of Sélestat close to the painter's family who devoted some writings to Fiebig, became the universal legatee of Fiebig's work. But if he helped to make the work of Fiebig better known, Logel apparently "drained" the bank accounts of Raya, the artist's daughter. In 2006, the former Selestadian official and his son were tried for abuse of weakness to one year of prison probation sentence. Raya Fiebig died without children in January 2007.

Fiebig: A European Expressionist 
"I was poor, I had a German name, I had a Nordic mindset: all things that made it impossible for me to succeed quickly. But positive reviews encouraged me.” Frédéric Fiebig

His work, praised by Guillaume Apollinaire, Francis Carco, André Salmon, is not enough to get him out of oblivion. Fiebig is still hardly known in Alsace where he spent half of his life. Yet the art critic Clément Morrolobt ("Morro") considers him "an impressionist in the true sense of the word". French academician and art specialist, Maurice Rheims mentions him as the only "French" painter who was really part of Die Brücke expressionist movement, although he was not necessarily conscious of it. Some short articles in the local Alsacian press and a thesis are devoted to him, but it seems that his work is still very much unrecognized in France. In Latvia, art specialists and scholars are more and more celebrating his work. Profoundly European by his personal history, Fiebig evolved between Post-Impressionism and Expressionism. Fiebig leaves a comprehensive work dominated by a transfigured vision of urban landscape and nature, in the context of a life broken by the two world wars.

Notable work
 Selfportrait, 1912, oil on cardboard
 Portrait of Eric and Raya, 1925, oil on cardboard
 Portrait of Eric with a red coat, 1925, oil on cardboard, private collection
 Portrait of Madame Fiebig, oil on cardboard
 The Port of Naples (Italy), 1911, oil on cardboard
 Olive trees at Terracina (Italy), 1911, oil on cardboard
 Notre-Dame de Paris cathedral from the banks of the river Seine, 1925/27, oil on cardboard, private collection
 The Luxembourg garden (Paris), 1925/27, oil on cardboard, private collection
 The roofs of Paris, 1925/27, oil on cardboard, private collection
 A shelter in winter (Tännchel, Grimmelshütte), 1934/35, oil on cardboard
 The castle of Giersberg, 1934, oil on cardboard, Unterlinden Museum, Colmar, France
 Haystack, 1930/34, oil on cardboard
 Cocks, 1925, oil on cardboard
 Woods and underwood, 1934/35, oil on cardboard
 Portrait of Leon Tolstoï, woodprint, 1910, Tolstoï Museum, Moscow, Russia

Museums
 National Museum of Arts, Riga, Latvia
 Talsi Regional Museum / Talsi New Museum, Latvia
 Tolstoï Museum, Moscow, Russia
 Académie Julian, Paris, France
 Unterlinden Museum, Colmar, France
 Mulhouse Museum of Fine Arts, France
 Strasbourg Museum of Fine Arts, France
 Bibliothèque Humaniste, Sélestat, France

See also 
 Académie Julian
 Expressionism
 Die Brücke

Bibliography
 Abele Kristiana, Artist from Latvia on the map of late 19th and early 20th century in Europe: a glimpse into the routes, forms and results of their migration, Institute of Art History of the Latvian Academy of Art, Akademijas laukums 1–160, Riga LV-1050, Latvia, 2006
 Baziller Laurent, Histoire des fortifications de Paris ("History of Paris fortifications"), sur http://www.laurentbaziller-graphiste.fr/fortifs/histoire3.html
 Braeuner Hélène, "Les peintres et l’Alsace; autour de l’impressionnisme"("Painters and Alsace around impressionism"), La Renaissance du Livre, 2003
 Kapsreiter-Homeyer Kyra, "Des contes et des livres, aspects inédits de Frédéric Fiebig" (Tales and books, unknown aspects of the work of Frédéric Fiebig), Annuaire de la Société des Amis de la Bibliothèque Humaniste de Sélestat, no 53, p. 9-15, 2003
 Kapsreiter-Homeyer Kyra, "Frédéric Fiebig", Annuaire de la Société des Amis de la Bibliothèque Humaniste de Sélestat", no 47, p. 7-15, 1997
 Kapsreiter-Homeyer Kyra, "Frédéric Fiebig, Sa vie et son œuvre" ("Fiebig, life and art works"), PhD dissertation, Giessen University (Germany), 1992
 Kashey Robert and Kapsreiter-Homeyer Kyra, Frederic Fiebig: St. Petersburg - Paris - Alsace, 1885–1953, New York (USA), Shepherd Gallery, 1990
 Kaufmann Jean-Paul, "Courlande" ("Courland"), Fayard, 2009 (page on Frédéric Fiebig)
 Lehni Nadine, Geyer Marie-Jeanne, Walther Daniel, Frédéric Fiebig. "Des plaines de Courlande au Ried alsacien" ("From Courland to Alsace"), foreword by Maurice Rheims, 1984
 Lorentz Francis, Bergheim vu par les artistes, Société d'histoire de Bergheim, 2013 (catalogue of the exhibition: "Bergheim vu par les artistes à travers les siècles" ("Bergheim seen by artists across centuries") organized for the celebration of the 700 years of the city)
 Millerstone Guna, Frederic Fiebig 120, Catalogue des œuvres de l'artiste, pour le 120e anniversaire de sa naissance ("Catalogue of the works of the artist for the celebration of the 120th year of his birth"), 2005
 Regional Museum of Talsi, Notice on Frédéric Fiebig exhibition for his 130-year anniversary, 6 June 2015

References

External links 
 http://www.fredericfiebig.com

1885 births
1953 deaths
19th-century French painters
20th-century French painters
20th-century French male artists
Abstract painters
Académie Julian alumni
Post-Impressionist artists
Cubist artists
Expressionist painters
French male painters
French people of Latvian descent
Modern painters
People from Talsi
French abstract artists
19th-century French male artists
Emigrants from the Russian Empire to France